John Larson may refer to:
 John Augustus Larson, inventor of the polygraph
John B. Larson, congressman from Connecticut
John David Larson, retired Brigadier General in the National Guard of the United States
John Larson (journalist), reporter for Dateline NBC

See also
John Larsson, former general of The Salvation Army.
Jonathan Larson (1960–1996), American composer, lyricist, and playwright
John Larsen (disambiguation)